Thomas & Friends is a children's television series about the engines and other characters on the railways of the Island of Sodor, and is based on The Railway Series books written by the Reverend W. Awdry. 

This article lists and details episodes from the twenty-third series show, which began airing on 2 September 2019 in the UK, and first aired on 18 May 2019 in the US. It consisted of 20 11-minute episodes as well as three 20-minute specials, two of which are directly interconnected and form a movie titled Digs and Discoveries. It was the last season to air on Nick Jr. in the US, with 2 specials aired.

Voice cast

 John Hasler as Thomas (UK)
 Joseph May as Thomas (US)
 Federico Trujillo as Raul, a Batucada Musician, and a Brazilian Workman
 Monica Lopera as Gabriela
 Laura Cucurullo as Cassia and a Batucata Musician
 Francisco Labbe as Gustavo and a Batucata Musician
 Gabriel Porras as Emerson and Fernando
 Keith Wickham as Gordon (UK), Edward (UK), Henry (UK), Glynn, Den, Norman, Harold (UK), Bertie, Skarloey, Sir Topham Hatt, the Bird Watcher, the Grumpy Passenger, Passenger, the Great Railway Show Judge, a Child (US/UK), Some Children (UK), some Passengers, and some Workman
 Kerry Shale as Gordon (US), Henry (US), Diesel (UK/US), Harold (US), Kevin (US), Max (US), and the Troublesome Trucks
 Teresa Gallagher as Emily (UK), Annie and Clarabel, Belle, The Lady in Yellow Dress and Hat, The Teacher, Albert's Wife, The Lady in Blue Dress, Some Children, School Girl with two curly ponytails, The Ginger Haired Boy, Brenda, and The Sodor Rangers (US/UK)
 Jules de Jongh as Emily (US), Some Children (US), and Caitlin (UK/US)
 William Hope as Edward (US) and Toby (US)
 Rob Rackstraw as James (UK/US), Toby (UK), Stanley, Owen, the Man with Green Waistcoat and Grey Hair, The Crown Thief 2 (US/UK), a Passenger (UK/US), Monty (US), and the Troublesome Trucks
 Glenn Wrage as Cranky (US)
 David Bedella as Victor (UK/US)
 Ian McCue as The Crown Thief 1 (UK/US)
 Tim Bain as Aiden, Madeleine's Father (UK/US), some Passengers (US/UK), and some Workmen (UK/US)
 Christopher Ragland as Percy (US), a Passenger, and the Troublesome Trucks
 Tina Desai as Ashima and The Indian Fashion Designer (UK/US)
 Steve Kynman as Duck, Paxton, Dart, Peter Sam, and a Child (US)
 Nigel Pilkington as Percy (UK)
 Tom Stourton as Terence and Alfie
 Colin McFarlane as Bulgy
 Bob Golding as Sidney
 Tim Whitnall as Oliver and Monty (UK)
 Miranda Raison as Millie
 Shane Jacobson as Shane
 Sheena Bhattessa as Noor Jehan and Charubala
 Sanjeev Bhaskar as Shankar
 Chipo Chung as Hong-Mei
 Genevieve McCarthy as Aubrey
 Rachael Miller as Rebecca
 Harriet Kershaw as Jenny Packard and Darcy
 Yvonne Grundy as Nia
 Matt Wilkinson as Cranky (UK), Kevin (UK) and a Workman
 David Menkin as Jack (US) and Porter (US)
 Siu-see Hung as An An and the Chinese Women
 Windson Liong as Yin-Long and the Chinese Men
 Dan Li as Yong Bao
 Nikhil Parnar as Rajiv, the Indian Friendly Stationmaster, the Indian Grumpy Stationmaster, and the Indian Troublesome Trucks
 Flaminia Cinque as Ester and Dam Bella
 Anna Francolini as Gina, some Italian Children, and some Italian Passengers
 Montserrat Lombard as Mia and some Italian Passengers
 Antonio Magro as Stefano, the Italian Stationmaster, and some Italian Workmen
 Vincenzo Nicoli as Lorenzo, Beppe, an Italian Workman, and some Italian Passengers

Episodes

References

Thomas & Friends seasons
2019 British television seasons
2020 British television seasons